It's a Pleasure! is a 1945 American Technicolor Comedy-drama musical film directed by William A. Seiter and starring Sonja Henie, Michael O'Shea and Marie McDonald.

Plot
Don Martin's career in ice hockey screeches to a halt when he punches a referee. Banned from the sport for life, he is consoled by Chris Linden, a lovely skater who performs for the crowd during the hockey games' intermissions.

Chris has a crush on Don and introduces him to Buzz Fletcher, who runs an ice-skating revue. Don joins the show as a performer and marries Chris, but has a drinking problem. Buzz's bored wife Gail develops a romantic interest in Don and is furious when he resists. She gets him drunk and ruins his opportunity to perform a solo in the show.

Complications arise and result in Chris leaving her husband and going away for two years on tour with the show. Gail's guilty conscience gets the better of her and she reunites Chris and Don in the end.

Cast
Sonja Henie as Chris Linden
Michael O'Shea as Don Martin
Marie McDonald as Gail Fletcher
Bill Johnson as Buzz 'Buzzard' Fletcher
Gus Schilling as Bill Evans
Iris Adrian as Wilma
Cheryl Walker as Loni
Peggy O'Neill as Cricket
Arthur Loft as Jack Weimar
David Janssen as Davey / boy referee (uncredited)

Production
Sonja Henie had made nine pictures for 20th Century Fox ending with Wintertime. In December 1943 she signed a contract to make a movie for the newly formed International Pictures which was run by William Goetz who had been head of production at Fox briefly while Henie worked there. The film was to be part of International's initial slate of four pictures costing $5 million being distributed by RKO, the others being Casanova Brown, Belle of the Yukon and Once Off Guard.

Bill Johnson had been in Something for the Boys and was borrowed from MGM; it was his screen debut.

International leased two ice skating rinks, at Westwood Ice Garden and the Polar Palace in Hollywood. Filming started August 1, 1944.

Michael O'Shea was cast in August 1944, borrowed from Hunt Stromberg. In late August Hedda Hopper announced that Henie was refusing to talk to producer David Lewis and was only talking to designed Don Loper.

In November 1944 International announced they would make a second film with Henie, The Countess of Monte Cristo. It was not made for several years later, at Universal International.

Reception
The New York Times called it a "flaccid fable." ''

References

External links
It's a Pleasure at IMDb
It's a Pleasure at Letterbox DVD
It's a Pleasure at BFI

1945 musical comedy films
1945 films
American musical comedy films
Figure skating films
Films directed by William A. Seiter
1940s American films